This is a list of films encoded in the SDDS sound format with eight channels of sound, rather than the usual six.

The first film to use this format was Last Action Hero (1993), and the last was Surf's Up (2007).

1993	
Geronimo: An American Legend	
In the Line of Fire	
Last Action Hero	
Rudy

1994
Blankman
City Slickers II: The Legend of Curly's Gold
Immortal Beloved
Little Big League
Mary Shelley's Frankenstein
The Next Karate Kid

1995
Bad Boys
Desperado
Devil in a Blue Dress
Dracula: Dead and Loving It
First Knight
Hideaway
Johnny Mnemonic
Judge Dredd
Legends of the Fall
Mortal Kombat
The Net
Never Talk to Strangers
Sense and Sensibility
Batman Forever

1996
Alaska
The English Patient
The Fan
Fly Away Home
From Dusk Till Dawn
Heavy Metal (reissue 8-channel remix)
Mary Reilly
Matilda
Multiplicity
Mrs. Winterbourne
Race the Sun
Screamers
Twister
Space Jam
The Cable Guy

1997
Addicted to Love
Air Force One
Anaconda
Con Air
Das Boot: The Director's Cut
Excess Baggage
The Fifth Element
Gattaca
Ghosts of Mississippi
Masterminds
Men In Black
My Best Friend's Wedding
The Second Jungle Book: Mowgli & Baloo
Seven Years in Tibet

1998
Apt Pupil
The Avengers
Godzilla
Les Misérables
Out of Sight
The Rugrats Movie
The Replacement Killers
The Negotiator
Armageddon
Small Soldiers
Lethal Weapon 4
Paulie
Mulan
Bride of Chucky
Dennis the Menace Strikes Again
Babe: Pig in the City
The Prince of Egypt
Simon Birch

1999
Blue Streak
Crazy in Alabama
Star Wars: Episode I – The Phantom Menace
Tarzan
American Beauty
The Haunting
Stuart Little
Baby Geniuses
Toy Story 2
The End of the Affair
The Adventures of Elmo in Grouchland
Deep Blue Sea
The Matrix
Three Kings
The Insider
Austin Powers: The Spy Who Shagged Me

2000
All the Pretty Horses
Charlie's Angels
Erin Brockovich
Finding Forrester
Girl, Interrupted
Godzilla 2000: Millennium
High Fidelity
Hollow Man
The Perfect Storm
The 6th Day
U-571
Vertical Limit
Fantasia 2000
What Lies Beneath
Gladiator
Meet the Parents
Mission: Impossible 2
Gun Shy
Mission to Mars
The Flintstones in Viva Rock Vegas
The Contender
The Legend of Bagger Vance
The Cell
Cast Away
Unbreakable
Rugrats in Paris: The Movie
The Grinch Stole Christmas

2001
Final Fantasy: The Spirits Within
Glitter
Windtalkers
Harry Potter and the Sorcerer's Stone
A Knight's Tale
Ali
Ocean's Eleven
Pearl Harbor
See Spot Run
Atlantis: The Lost Empire
Shrek
Osmosis Jones
Cats & Dogs

2002
Black Hawk Down
Rollerball
Scooby-Doo
Solaris
Spider-Man
Stuart Little 2
Men in Black II
The Time Machine

2003
Bad Boys II
Big Fish
Charlie's Angels: Full Throttle
Intolerable Cruelty
Terminator 3: Rise of the Machines
Underworld
Rugrats Go Wild
Anger Management
The Jungle Book 2
Bruce Almighty
Piglet's Big Movie

2004
Anacondas: The Hunt for the Blood Orchid
Criminal
Ocean's Twelve
Spider-Man 2
Shrek 2
Shark Tale
The Incredibles

2005
Fun with Dick and Jane
The Legend of Zorro
Oliver Twist
Stealth
Zathura: A Space Adventure
Hitch
Pooh's Heffalump Movie
Bewitched
Chicken Little
Yours, Mine & Ours
The Pacifier
Wallace and Gromit: The Curse of the Were-Rabbit
Charlie and the Chocolate Factory
Madagascar
Valiant

2006
The Da Vinci Code
Happy Feet
Open Season
RV
Talladega Nights: The Ballad of Ricky Bobby

2007
Ghost Rider
Spider-Man 3
Surf's Up

References

External links
 Official SDDS list from wayback machine archive

Film sound production
Lists of films by technology
Sony